James Baker Bartlett (May 27, 1932 – August 27, 2021) was a Canadian ice hockey left winger. He played in the National Hockey League with the Montreal Canadiens, Boston Bruins, and New York Rangers between 1954 and 1961. The rest of his career, which lasted from 1951 to 1973, was mainly spent in the minor American Hockey League.

Professional career
Bartlett's career was mainly played in the American Hockey League for the Baltimore Clippers and Providence Reds, over twenty years. He spent three years with the New York Rangers and one with the Boston Bruins, as well as having played four games with the Montreal Canadiens early in his career playing a total of 191 games in the NHL. He set an AHL record in 1958 when he scored two goals five seconds apart. He almost had his career end in 1963 when he was hit in his eye with a stick, however, he was back playing within months.

Post-pro career
Close to the end of his professional hockey career, Bartlett kept his skills sharp by playing with the National Brewers, a Baltimore area amateur team that was sponsored by the National Brewing Company and National Bohemian.  He returned to the pro level to score 8 goals in 11 games for the Baltimore Clippers during the end of the 1971-72 season, and then played another full 72-game season with Clippers in 1972-73.

In 1974, Bartlett brought his professional hockey career to a close and then enjoyed four more seasons of amateur hockey in the Baltimore-Washington area with the Brewers.  During the five seasons that Bartlett played with the Brewers, he worked as a driver for the National Brewing Company in Baltimore.

Bartlett moved from Baltimore to Tampa, Florida in 1987.  Making use of his experience as a driver, he became a full-time assistant as an advisor and driver for George Steinbrenner. In 2018, he was inducted into the American Hockey League Hall of Fame.

Records
American Hockey League record for fastest two goals scored (1958)

Career statistics

Regular season and playoffs

References

External links

1932 births
2021 deaths
Anglophone Quebec people
Baltimore Clippers players
Boston Bruins players
Boston Olympics players
Cincinnati Mohawks (IHL) players
Columbus Golden Seals players
Ice hockey people from Montreal
Montreal Canadiens players
New York Rangers players
Providence Reds players
People from Verdun, Quebec